Guanahatabey (Guanajatabey) was the language of the Guanahatabey people, a hunter-gatherer society that lived in western Cuba until the 16th century. Very little is known of it, as the Guanahatabey died off early in the period of Spanish colonization before substantial information about them was recorded. Evidence suggests it was distinct from the Taíno language spoken in the rest of the island.

Background
The Guanahatabey were hunter-gatherers that appear to have predated the agricultural Ciboney, the Taíno group that inhabited most of Cuba. By the contact period, the Guanahatabey lived primarily in far western Pinar del Río Province, which the Ciboney did not settle and was colonized by the Spanish relatively late. Spanish accounts indicate that Guanahatabey was distinct from and mutually unintelligible with the Taíno language spoken in the rest of Cuba and throughout the Caribbean. Not a single word of the Guanahatabey language has been documented.

Toponyms
However, Julian Granberry and Gary Vescelius have identified five placenames that they consider non-Taíno, and which may thus derive from Guanahatabey. Granberry and Vescelius argue that the names have parallels in the Warao language, and further suggest a possible connection with the Macoris language of Hispaniola (see Waroid languages).

See also
Pre-Arawakan languages of the Greater Antilles

Notes

References

Extinct languages of North America
Indigenous peoples in Cuba
Languages of Cuba
Pre-Arawakan languages of the Greater Antilles
Languages extinct in the 16th century